Ahasanul Islam Titu (born 11 December 1969) is a Bangladesh Awami League politician and the incumbent member of parliament for Tangail-6.

Education
Titu graduated from Assumption University (Thailand) with a BBA degree. He graduated with an MBA from Pittsburg State University, US, in 1993.

Career
Titu was elected to parliament from Tangail-6 as a Bangladesh Awami League candidate on 30 December 2018. Titu was the founding president of the Dhaka Stock Exchange's Brokerage Association.

Associations
Titu is a prominent business leader and capital markets giant that has a long history of involvement in the financial sector of Bangladesh. In 1998 he was the convener of "DSE Automation Process Committee"  and automation of Dhaka Stock Exchange trading started on 10 August 1998. Furthermore, from 2005 to 2010 he was a member of the executive committee of the Bangladesh Insurance Association (BIA) and in 2012 was the vice president of BIA.

Titu was elected as the president of Dhaka Stock Exchange on June 15, 2013. Prior to that, he held the position of senior vice president of DSE from March 16, 2011, to March 15, 2012, after being elected director on March 16, 2011, for the third time. Before that he held the position of vice chairman of DSE from March 30, 2000, to March 29, 2001, and from December 18, 1997, to March 30, 2000, he was the councillor of DSE.

Personal life
Titu married Ariya Islam in 1994; the two met while they were studying at Assumption University (Thailand). They have three children: Aniqa, Alisa and Ariq. Aniqa completed her bachelor's degree at Mahidol University in Thailand and then proceeded to complete her master's degree in Public Health at Johns Hopkins University in the US. Alisa completed her BBA at Temple University in Philadelphia, US, and her Masters in Business Analytics from Imperial College London in the UK. Ariq completed his bachelor's degree at Chulalongkorn University in Thailand.

References

Awami League politicians
Living people
11th Jatiya Sangsad members
1969 births